Stefan Luitz (born 26 March 1992) is a German World Cup alpine ski racer. He primarily competes in giant slalom, but in January 2016 at Kitzbühel, Luitz completed both runs in slalom, a first in his World Cup career, and finished eighteenth. His only previous second run in slalom was more than three years earlier, in December 2012 at Madonna di Campiglio, where he failed to finish.

Luitz made his World Cup debut at Adelboden in 2011, and attained his first podium in December 2012, a second place in giant slalom at Val d'Isère, France.

World Cup results

Season standings

Race podiums
 1 win – (1 GS)
 8 podiums – (7 GS, 1 PG)

World Championship results

Olympic results

References

External links

German male alpine skiers
1992 births
Living people
Alpine skiers at the 2014 Winter Olympics
Olympic alpine skiers of Germany